Dmitry Nikolayevich Zubarev (November 27, 1917 – July 29, 1992) was a Soviet and Russian theoretical physicist known for his contributions to statistical mechanics, non-equilibrium thermodynamics, plasma physics, theory of turbulence, and to the development of the double-time Green function's formalism.

Biography
Dmitry Zubarev was born in Moscow in the family of an engineer. In 1941, he graduated from the Physics Department at Moscow State University and soon after that, on 25 June 1941, volunteered to the People's Volunteer Corps to participate in the Second World War. He participated in the Battle of Moscow and met the end of the war in Berlin with the 47th Army of the 1st Belorussian Front.

After the war he worked for several years on various military related research projects in Arzamas-16. In this period of time he was greatly influenced by Nikolay Bogolyubov and Andrei Sakharov. Then, in 1954 he moved to the Steklov Institute of Mathematics, where continued to work for the rest of his life.

Research work
His first research in Arzamas-16 was devoted to various applications of plasma theory, including analysis of stationary regimes for nuclear reactors (jointly with V. N. Klimov) and analysis of temperature jumps of plasma in magnetic field.

After that he started to work in collaboration with Nikolay Bogolyubov on various problems in theoretical physics and obtained several fundamental results, including development of an asymptotic method for systems with rapidly rotating phases, development of the method of collective variables which is now widely used in theoretical physics, and development of the microscopic theory of superfluidity.

He made a significant contribution to the theory of double-time temperature Green's functions in statistical mechanics, where his work  became world-famous.

In the period 1961—1965, he developed a method of non-equilibrium statistical operator (NSO), which is now a classical tool in the statistical theory of non-equilibrium processes. This method allowed him to include non-equilibrium phenomena in the framework of statistical mechanics in a natural way following the ideas of Josiah Willard Gibbs. Using the NSO method, he constructed relativistic thermodynamics and relativistic hydrodynamics, the statistical transport theory for systems of particles with internal degrees of freedom, and the statistical thermodynamics for turbulent transport processes.

Zubarev was an editorial staff member of the journal Theoretical and Mathematical Physics and a member of the International Editorial staff of the journals Physica A and Physics Letters A.

Publications

Books
Zubarev D. N. (1974): Nonequilibrium Statistical Thermodynamics (Originally published in Russian by Nauka, Moscow in 1971, and translated to English, German, Japanese, and Polish languages). New York, Consultants Bureau. ; .
Zubarev D. N., Morozov V., Ropke G. (1996): Statistical Mechanics of Nonequilibrium Processes: Basic Concepts, Kinetic Theory. John Wiley & Sons. .
Zubarev D. N., Morozov V., Ropke G. (1997): Statistical Mechanics of Nonequilibrium Processes: Relaxation and Hydrodynamic Processes. John Wiley & Sons. .

Selected paper

See also
Non-equilibrium statistical operator

References
Dmitry Nikolayevich Zubarev (on his seventieth birthday), N. N. Bogoliubov, V. S. Vladimirov Russian Math. Surveys 43(4), 241—243 (1988). (in English)
Dmitry Nikolayevich Zubarev (Obituary) Uspekhi Fiz. Nauk 163, 107—108 (1993). (in English)

External links
Biography of D.N. Zubarev
Biographies of famous scientists
Bogoliubov Laboratory of Theoretical Physics

1917 births
1992 deaths
20th-century Russian physicists
Moscow State University alumni
Honoured Scientists of the Russian Federation
Recipients of the Order of the Red Banner of Labour
Recipients of the Order of the Red Star
Theoretical physicists
Russian physicists
Soviet physicists
Burials at Vagankovo Cemetery